Heather Margaret Fisher (born 13 June 1984) is an English rugby union and rugby sevens player. She represented  at the 2010 Women's Rugby World Cup. She was also named in the squad to the 2014 Women's Rugby World Cup.

Fisher made her international rugby debut in 2009 after a stint in bobsledding. She represented Team GB in rugby sevens at the 2016 Summer Olympics. Great Britain lost the rugby sevens bronze medal match to Canada.

She has severe alopecia.

References

External links
 
 

1984 births
Living people
Commonwealth Games bronze medallists for England
Commonwealth Games medallists in rugby sevens
England women's international rugby union players
England international women's rugby sevens players
English female rugby union players
Great Britain national rugby sevens team players
Olympic rugby sevens players of Great Britain
Rugby sevens players at the 2016 Summer Olympics
Rugby sevens players at the 2018 Commonwealth Games
Rugby union players from Birmingham, West Midlands
Medallists at the 2018 Commonwealth Games